Donald or Don Fox may refer to:
Donald Fox (bobsleigh), American bobsledder
Don Fox (1935–2008), English rugby league player
Donald W. Fox (born 1922), American politician